The 2011 Korea National League Championship was the eighth competition of the Korea National League Championship.

Ansan Hallelujah did not participate, but R League team Korean Police participated in the competition as an invited team.

Group stage

Group A

Group B

Group C

Group D

Knockout stage

Bracket

Quarter-finals

Semi-finals

Final

See also
2011 in South Korean football
2011 Korea National League

References

External links

Korea National League Championship seasons
K